Prochelidella buitreraensis was a species of fossil turtle assigned to the family Chelidae, a group of freshwater turtles which lived in the Cenomanian during the Upper Cretaceous, approximately 100 million years ago. Its specific epithet, buitreraensis, is due to the paleonthologic site La Buitrera, where it was found.

Characteristics
The remains are notable for their exceptional state of preservation, which includes the presence of the skull. Besides, the remains of cervical vertebrae, the shell and the appendicular skeleton have also been found. The remains were found in Cañadón de las Tortugas, at La Buitrera, Río Negro Province, Argentine Patagonia, by scientists from CONICET. The estimated age of the finding, from the Cenomanian age, was calculated with radiometric dating carried out on zircons on a volcanic tuff. The remains of Prochelydella buitreraensis are hosted at Carlos Ameghino Provincial Museum in the city of Cipolletti, Río Negro Province, Argentina. Its discovery appears to show that turtles and tortoises at some point in their early history were incapable of hiding their heads into their shells.

References

Late Cretaceous turtles
Chelidae
Fossils of Argentina
Prehistoric turtles of South America
Cretaceous Argentina